The bareback shovelnose ray (Rhinobatos nudidorsalis) or nakedback guitarfish, is a species of fish in the Rhinobatidae family. It is found in Seychelles and Mauritius. Its natural habitat is open seas.

References

bareback shovelnose ray
Fauna of Seychelles
Fauna of Mauritius
Fish of the Indian Ocean
bareback shovelnose ray
Taxonomy articles created by Polbot